‘Arura (‘Arūrā) is a Palestinian town located in the Ramallah and al-Bireh Governorate in the northern West Bank, north of Ramallah. Most of the village is situated 500 meters above sea level.

History 
Pottery sherds from the  IA I, IA II, Persian, Hellenistic, Roman,  Byzantine and   Crusader/Ayyubid  eras have been found here.

Near, and within the village are three shrines dedicated to Sheikh Radwan, Sheikh Ahmad, and al-Khidr. Al-Khidr's shrine, in the center of the village, has no relation to al-Khidr, and his simply dedicated to a holy man with the same name. Al-Khidr or Saint George is revered throughout Palestine in several towns and villages. Sheikh Ahmad's shrine is to the west of 'Arura.

Not much is known about Radwan, except that his family was from Arsuf and he was an important man in the area that died in Egypt and was transferred to 'Arura for his burial. Muslim scholars suggested that Sheikh Radwan was from the 'Ulayl family. An Arabic inscription written in typical rural Ayyubid style, on the shrine's surface reads that he was transferred to "blessed Syria" (in early Islamic times, Palestine was a province of Syria). A mosque was constructed adjacent to the shrine.

Pottery sherds from the  Mamluk era have also been found here.

Ottoman era 
In 1596 'Arura  appeared in the Ottoman tax registers as being in the Nahiya of Quds of the Liwa of Quds.  It had a population of 62  households, all Muslim, who paid a fixed tax rate of 33,3% on agricultural products, including on wheat, barley, olive trees, vineyards and fruit trees, goats and/or beehives; a total of 12,000  akçe. 1/6 of the revenue went to a Waqf.

In 1838 'Arurah was noted as a Muslim village, part of the Beni Zeid area, located north of Jerusalem.

Victor Guérin  visited the village in the late 19th century,  and found it to have about  350-400 inhabitants. He also observed fragments of columns and other indications of an ancient town. There were also threshing-floors which appeared  ancient.

Socin found from an official Ottoman village list from about 1870  that  Arura had a total of 91 houses and a population of 300, though the population count included men, only.

In 1882, the PEF's Survey of Western Palestine  described the village, called Arara, as being a small, on high ground, and remarkable for  having five sacred places on the west side of the village.

In 1896 the different parts of  Arura  was estimated to have about 237, 99 and  204 inhabitants; in all a population of 540 persons.

British Mandate era 
In the 1922 census of Palestine conducted by the British Mandate authorities,  'Arura had a population of 426 Muslim, increasing in the   1931 census to 566 Muslim, in 131  houses.

The 1945 statistics found 660 Muslim inhabitants, with a  total land area of  10,978 dunams.  Of  this,  7,095  were used for plantations and irrigable land, 787 for cereals, while 26 dunams were classified as built-up areas.

Jordanian era 
In the wake of the 1948 Arab–Israeli War, and after the 1949 Armistice Agreements, 'Arura  came under Jordanian rule.

In 1961, the population of 'Arura was  1,337.

Post 1967 
Since the Six-Day War in 1967,  'Arura  has been under Israeli occupation.

There was a sharp decrease in the population from 1961 to 1982, caused by nearly half of 'Arura's inhabitants fleeing the village in the 1967 Six-Day War. In 1997, 'Arura had a population of 2,087, of which 30 residents (1.4%) were Palestinian refugees. The gender make-up was 1,069 males and 1,018 females. According to the Palestinian Central Bureau of Statistics, it had a population of approximately 2,967 in mid-year 2006.

Shrines
Near and within 'Arura are three shrines dedicate to Sheikh Radwan, Sheikh Ahmad, and al-Khidr. Al-Khidr's shrine, in the center of the village, has no relation to al-Khidr and his simply dedicated to him. Al-Khidr or Saint George is revered throughout Palestine in several towns and villages. Sheikh Ahmad shrine is to the west of 'Arura.

The Shrine of Sheikh Radwan bin 'Ulayl al-Arsufi, built during the Ayyubid rule of interior Palestine, is located to the southwest of the village situated on a hill roughly 600 meters above sea level. Not much is known about Radwan, except that he was an important man — whose ancestors were from Arsuf — in the area that died in Egypt and was transferred to 'Arura for his burial. Muslim scholars suggested that Sheikh Radwan was from the 'Ulayl family. An Arabic inscription written in typical rural Ayyubid style, on the shrine's surface reads that he was transferred to "blessed Syria" (in early Islamic times, Palestine was referred to as a province in Syria). A mosque was constructed adjacent to the shrine.

Geography
'Arura is located in the Bani Zeid area of central Samaria, situated 500 meters above sea level. Other nearby localities include Mazari an-Nubani to the northeast, Deir as-Sudan to southeast, Kafr Ein to the east, and Abwein to the southwest. In 1945, 'Arura's total land area was 10,978 dunams, of which was 26 were built-up areas and 2,550 used for olive groves.

Demographics
In the 1922 British survey of Palestine, 'Arura had 426 inhabitants rising to 566 in the 1931 census. There were 660 residents in 1945, according to Sami Hadawi's land and population survey. There was a sharp decrease in the population from 1961 to 1982, caused by nearly half of 'Arura's inhabitants fleeing the village in the 1967 Six-Day War. In 1997, 'Arura had a population of 2,087, of which 30 residents (1.4%) were Palestinian refugees. The gender make-up was 1,069 males and 1,018 females. According to the Palestinian Central Bureau of Statistics, it had a population of approximately 2,967 in mid-year 2006.

References

Bibliography

External links
Welcome To 'Arura
Survey of Western Palestine, Map 14:  IAA, Wikimedia commons

Arura